Begum Farhat Khawaja Rafique  is a Pakistani politician who had been a member of the Provincial Assembly of the Punjab between 1985 and 1988.

She was elected from PP-106 – Lahore as an independent candidate in 1985 Pakistani general election.

She is mother of former Minister for Railways Khawaja Saad Rafique and Khawaja Salman Rafique.

References

Punjab MPAs 1985–1988
Pakistan Muslim League (N) MPAs (Punjab)
People from Amritsar
Punjabi people
Possibly living people
Year of birth missing
Women members of the Provincial Assembly of the Punjab